Okenia impexa is a species of sea slug, specifically a dorid nudibranch, a marine gastropod mollusc in the family Goniodorididae.

Distribution
This species was described from Brazil. It is known from Brazil north to North Carolina, USA. It has also been reported from the western Mediterranean and the Cape Verde Islands.

Description
This Okenia has a tall body and about five or six lateral papillae on each side of the mantle.

The maximum recorded body length is 3–4 mm or up to 7 mm.

Habitat 
Minimum recorded depth is 0 m. Maximum recorded depth is 0 m.

Ecology
The diet of this species is unknown but the shape of the animal resembles ascidian eating species of Okenia such as Okenia aspersa.

References

External links

Goniodorididae
Gastropods described in 1957
Molluscs of the Atlantic Ocean
Molluscs of the Mediterranean Sea
Molluscs of Brazil
Gastropods of Cape Verde